Norapella bipennis is a moth of the family Megalopygidae. It was described by Walter Hopp in 1930.

References

Moths described in 1930
Megalopygidae